John Samson may refer to:
John K. Samson (born 1973), Canadian musician
John Samson (filmmaker) (1946–2004), Scottish documentary filmmaker